The Water Margin is a Japanese television series based on the 14th-century book Water Margin, one of the Four Great Classical Novels of Chinese literature. Made in two seasons of 13 episodes each by Nippon Television it was shown in Japan in 1973 and 1974 as Suikoden.

The novel details the trials and tribulations of 108 outlaws during the Song Dynasty. This adaptation follows Lin Chung (Atsuo Nakamura) and his clashes with the local government official Kao Chiu (Kei Satō).

For an English-language version, it was adapted by David Weir without translations, using only brief plot synopses. The dubbed version, narrated by Burt Kwouk, was shown by the BBC from 1976 to 1978. An English novelisation, written by Weir, was released in 1978 as Water Margin.

Episode list

Series 1
The first ten episodes were shown on the BBC from 21 September 1976 to 23 November 1976. The final three episodes were shown just before series 2 from 20 September 1977 to 4 October 1977.

Series 2
On the BBC series 2 followed on from series 1, shown from 11 October 1977 to 3 January 1978.

Home video
In the UK a DVD box set of both series was released by Fabulous Films in 2005. This was of a censored version broadcast before the watershed by the BBC in the early 1980s. In 2016 the series was reissued on DVD and Blu-ray with missing portions reinserted that were included in the original 1970s post-watershed broadcast. All UK releases only contain the English dubbed soundtrack.

In Germany a DVD box set was issued by Alive AG in 2008, followed by deluxe and basic Blu-ray sets in 2016 and 2017. As with the UK the series was also originally broadcast in a dubbed version, but all German DVD and Blu-ray releases have also included optional original Japanese audio with German subtitles. In its native Japan, the series was issued in a DVD box set in 2008.

Cast

 Atsuo Nakamura : Lin Chong
 Kei Satō : Gao Qiu
 Sanae Tsuchida  : Hu Sanniang
 Tetsuro Tamba : Huyan Zhuo
 So Yamamura : Lu Junyi
 Takahiro Tamura : Chai Jin
 Go Wakabayashi : Guan Sheng
 Takeshi Obayashi : Song Jiang
 Hajime Hana : Wu Song
 Atsushi Watanabe : Ruan Xiaoqi
 Isao Yamagata : Chao Gai
 Toshio Kurosawa : Dai Zong
 Teruhiko Aoi : Shi Jin
 Makoto Sato : Yang Zhi
 Sei Hiraizumi
 Kin Sugai
 Kei Taguchi
 Kōji Nanbara
 Akiji Kobayashi
 Ryōhei Uchida as Zhu Wu
 Toru Abe
 Susumu Kurobe
 Nobuo Kawai
 Isamu Nagato as Lu Zhishen
 Yutaka Mizutani : Emperor Huizong of Song

See also
The Water Margin (film) – 1972 Hong Kong version
Outlaws of the Marsh (TV series)
The Water Margin (1998 TV series)
All Men Are Brothers (TV series)

References

External links

BFI database
GeekPlanetOnline: Why I Love The Water Margin
TV.com guide

1970s British drama television series
1973 Japanese television series debuts
1974 Japanese television series endings
1976 British television series debuts
1978 British television series endings
BBC Television shows
Television series set in the Northern Song
Works based on Water Margin